The 1980 Milwaukee Brewers season involved the Brewers' finishing third in the American League East with a record of 86 wins and 76 losses. The Brewers led MLB in home runs (203), grand slams (8), runs batted in (774), slugging percentage (.448), on-base plus slugging (.777) and OPS+ (114).

Offseason 
 October 11, 1979: Juan Castillo was signed as an amateur free agent by the Brewers.
 December 6, 1979: Lenn Sakata was traded by the Brewers to the Baltimore Orioles for John Flinn.

Regular season

Season standings

Record vs. opponents

Notable transactions 
 April 3, 1980: Ray Fosse was released by the Brewers.
 July 24, 1980: Bill Lyons was signed as an amateur free agent by the Brewers.
 September 1, 1980: John Poff was selected off waivers by the Brewers from the Philadelphia Phillies.

Roster

Player stats

Batting

Starters by position 
Note: Pos = Position; G = Games played; AB = At bats; H = Hits; Avg. = Batting average; HR = Home runs; RBI = Runs batted in

Other batters 
Note: G = Games played; AB = At bats; H = Hits; Avg. = Batting average; HR = Home runs; RBI = Runs batted in

Pitching

Starting pitchers 
Note: G = Games pitched; IP = Innings pitched; W = Wins; L = Losses; ERA = Earned run average; SO = Strikeouts

Other pitchers 
Note: G = Games pitched; IP = Innings pitched; W = Wins; L = Losses; ERA = Earned run average; SO = Strikeouts

Relief pitchers 
Note: G = Games pitched; W = Wins; L = Losses; SV = Saves; ERA = Earned run average; SO = Strikeouts

Awards and honors 
 Cecil Cooper, Silver Slugger Award, first base

Farm system

The Brewers' farm system consisted of five minor league affiliates in 1980. The Holyoke Millers won the Eastern League championship, and the Stockton Ports won the California League championship.

Notes

External links 
1980 Milwaukee Brewers at Baseball Reference
1980 Milwaukee Brewers at Baseball Almanac

Milwaukee Brewers seasons
Milwaukee Brewers season
Mil